Acantharachne is a genus of African orb-weaver spiders first described by Albert Tullgren in 1910.

Taxonomy
The genus Acantharachne was erected by Albert Tullgren in 1910 for the species Acantharachne cornuta. There was already a genus of echinoderms with a name differing only in the last letter, Acantharachna, so in 1929,  Embrik Strand put forward a replacement name, Acantharanea. However, as the spelling was different, even if only by one letter, replacement was unnecessary.

Species
 it contains eight species:
Acantharachne cornuta Tullgren, 1910 – East Africa
Acantharachne giltayi Lessert, 1938 – Congo, Madagascar
Acantharachne lesserti Giltay, 1930 – Congo
Acantharachne madecassa Emerit, 2000 – Madagascar
Acantharachne milloti Emerit, 2000 – Madagascar
Acantharachne psyche Strand, 1913 – Central Africa
Acantharachne regalis Hirst, 1925 – Cameroon, Congo
Acantharachne seydeli Giltay, 1935 – Congo

References

Araneidae
Araneomorphae genera
Spiders of Africa